Rocky Harbour or Leung Shuen Wan Hoi is a harbour at the south-east of Sai Kung Peninsula, Hong Kong.

Islands
Several islands are hugging the harbour. It is adjacent to the former island of Leung Shuen Wan, also known as High Island.

List of islands

 Basalt Island
 Bay Islet
 Bluff Island
 Bun Bei Chau
 Cham Pai
 Chau Tsai
 Kong Tau Pai
 Lung Shuen Pai
 Ma Tsai Pai
 Nam Fung Chau
 Pin Chau
 Po Yue Pai
 Pyramid Rock
 Sam Pai
 Tai Pai
 Tong Hau Pai
 Town Island
 Tung Sam Chau
 Wai Kap Pai
 Wang Chau
 Wong Nai Chau
 Yi Pai
 Yuen Kong Chau

References

Ports and harbours of Hong Kong
Sai Kung District
Sai Kung Peninsula